The Nyiginya or the Banyiginya were a royal Tutsi ruling clan in the pre-colonial Rwanda.

References

Further reading
Antecedents to modern Rwanda : the Nyiginya Kingdom / Jan Vansina ; translated by the author.  JISC Catalogue record

Ethnic groups in Rwanda